Hossein Ghorbanzadeh is an Iranian journalist and Principlist politician who was General Secretary of Progress and Justice Population of Islamic Iran. He is also editor-in-chief of Hamshahri newspaper. He was previously editor-in-chief of local based Tehran Emrooz newspaper.

References

1980s births
Living people
People from Tehran
Iranian political journalists
Progress and Justice Population of Islamic Iran politicians
Secretaries-General of political parties in Iran
Imam Sadiq University alumni